The 2016–17 FC St. Pauli season is the club's 106th season of existence, and their sixth consecutive season in the 2. Bundesliga, the second tier of German football.

Background 

After narrowingly missing out on promotion during the 2015–16 season, FC. St Pauli started to strengthen the squad in the summer to mount another push for promotion.

Transfers

In

Out

Competitions

Preseason

2. Bundesliga

Table

Match results

DFB-Pokal

Statistics

Squad and statistics

|}

References

FC St. Pauli seasons
St. Pauli, FC